Loxotoma is a moth genus of the family Depressariidae.

Species
 Loxotoma elegans Zeller, 1854
 Loxotoma seminigrens Meyrick, 1932

References

Stenomatinae